Ahmed Zia Azimi (born 1977) is an Afghan football player. He has played for Afghanistan national team.

National team statistics

External links

1977 births
Living people
Afghan men's footballers
Footballers at the 2002 Asian Games

Association football defenders
Asian Games competitors for Afghanistan
Afghanistan international footballers